Boundary changes affecting the English county of Berkshire.

List of places transferred from Berkshire to Oxfordshire in 1974

Abingdon
Appleford-on-Thames
Appleton
Ardington
Ardington Wick
Ashbury
Aston Tirrold
Aston Upthorpe
Bablock Hythe
Badbury Hill
Bagley Wood
Baulking
Bayworth
Belmont
Besselsleigh
Blewbury
Boars Hill
Botley
Bourton, Vale of White Horse
Bow
Brightwell-cum-Sotwell
Buckland
Caldecott
Chain Hill
Charney Bassett
Childrey
Chilswell
Chilton
Cholsey
Compton Beauchamp
Coscote
Cothill
Cumnor
Cumnor Hill
Cumnor Hurst
Dean Court
Denchworth
Didcot
Dragon Hill, Uffington
Drayton, Vale of White Horse
Dry Sandford
Duxford
East Hagbourne
East Hanney
East Hendred
East Lockinge
Eaton
Eaton Hastings
Faringdon
Farmoor
Fernham
Frilford
Fulscot
Fyfield, Oxfordshire
Gainfield
Garford
Great Coxwell
Grove
Harcourt Hill
Harwell
Hatford
Hinksey
Hinksey Hill
Hinton Waldrist
Kennington
Kingston Bagpuize
Kingston Bagpuize with Southmoor
Kingston Lisle
Letcombe Bassett
Letcombe Regis
Little Coxwell
Little Wittenham
Littleworth
Lockinge
Long Wittenham
Longcot
Longworth
Lyford
Marcham
Moulsford
North Hinksey
Pusey
Radley
St. Helen Without
Seacourt
Shellingford
Shippon
Shrivenham
Sotwell
South Hinksey
South Moreton
Southmoor
Stanford in the Vale
Sunningwell
Sutton Courtenay
Swinford
Tubney
Uffington
Upton
Wallingford
Wantage
Watchfield
West Hagbourne
West Hanney
West Hendred
West Lockinge
White Horse Hill
Winterbrook
Wittenham Clumps
Woolstone
Wootton, Vale of White Horse
Wytham

See also

 List of boundary changes in South East England
 History of Berkshire

Notes

References

Boundary changes
Berkshire
Boundary changes
Boundary changes